Carlene LeFevre is a competitive eater from Henderson, Nevada. She and her husband, Rich LeFevre, are said to form the "First Family of Competitive Eating", and are both top ranked members of the International Federation of Competitive Eating. The childless couple has combined to take two of the top seven places in Nathan's Hot Dog Eating Contest in 2003, 2004, and 2005. She is nicknamed "The Madam of Etiquette" for her relative degree of decorum while consuming mass quantities of food quickly. Her trademark technique is called the "Carlene Pop," in which she bounces up and down while eating to get the food to settle.

LeFevre grew up in the San Francisco Bay Area and met her husband at a square dance in Daly City, California. She has worked as an elementary school teacher, aerobics instructor, and a Mary Kay cosmetics saleswoman. Her first notable gastronomic achievement was finishing the famed 72 ounce steak from the Big Texan steakhouse in Amarillo, Texas in 1985. The restaurant provided her meal for free after she finished the steak in under an hour. She has bested the Big Texan's challenge on more than ten occasions since then, and one such event was filmed for the Ripley's Believe It Or Not television program in 2000. The LeFevres started entering eating contests the following year. Since that time, they have competed in numerous competitions around the United States. LeFevre has also competed in a buffet contest in Japan. While she has placed high in many contests, the only contest she has won that was not a qualifying contest for Nathan's was a Posole (hominy stew) contest in New Mexico in November 2004.

In addition to their appearance on Ripley's, the LeFevres have also appeared on The Tonight Show, a buffet contest on the Travel Channel, the Donny & Marie Osmond Talk Show, The View and the BBC Worldservice's "Outlook" programme.
http://www.bbc.co.uk/worldservice/programmes/outlook/index.shtml

See also
 List of competitive eaters

External links
 International Federation of Competitive Eating Profile page
 Get Out Arizona interview
 2003 LA CityBeat article
 2003 Scope Magazine Article
 Las Vegas Review Journal article
 Big Texan 72 ounce steak finishers database

American competitive eaters
Living people
Year of birth missing (living people)
People from Henderson, Nevada